Lorenzo Bosisio (born 24 September 1944) is a retired Italian road and track cyclist. On the road he won a team bronze medal at the 1967 World Championships. Next year he had his best achievements on track, winning an Olympic bronze medal and a world title in the team pursuit, as well as a bronze medal in the individual pursuit at the world championships.

In 1969 Bosisio turned professional and won a silver medal in the individual pursuit at the 1970 World Championships. He had little success on the road, and retired in 1971.

References

1944 births
Living people
Italian male cyclists
Cyclists at the 1968 Summer Olympics
Olympic cyclists of Italy
Olympic bronze medalists for Italy
Olympic medalists in cycling
Cyclists from the Province of Mantua
Medalists at the 1968 Summer Olympics